The rail transport system in Estonia consists of about  of railway lines, of which  are currently in public use. The infrastructure of the railway network is mostly owned by the state and is regulated and surveyed by the Estonian Technical Surveillance Authority.

The  gauge used in Estonia is also compatible with Finland's  gauge. Sometimes it is defined to be  (see Rail gauge in Estonia), for example when buying track maintenance or vehicles from Finland.

Railways in Estonia today are used mostly for freight transport, but also for passenger traffic, with 8.3 million passengers reported in 2019. Passenger transport is most frequent near Tallinn, centred on the main Tallinn Baltic Station.

The Tallinn to Tartu railway is due to be electrified by 2024, with electrification of the remaining network expected to be completed by 2028. 16 new electric trains manufactured by Škoda Transportation are due to come into service starting 2024.

History

Network

 Total length: circa 1,200 km, of which 900 km in public use
 Gauge:  Russian gauge
 Electrified: .

The Estonian railway network is owned by the state-owned company AS Eesti Raudtee and the private company Edelaraudtee Infrastruktuuri AS. These railway network infrastructure operators provide all railway network services for railway operators running freight and passenger services.

Main lines 
 
 

Owned by AS Eesti Raudtee:
 Tallinn–Narva railway, . This line was completed in 1870. It was originally a part of the railway network of the Russian Empire, connecting Paldiski to St. Petersburg via Tallinn and Narva. Passenger trains are operated by Elron (Tallinn–Aegviidu, Tallinn–Tartu, Tallinn–Rakvere and Tallinn–Narva routes) and by GO Rail (international trains to Moscow and St. Petersburg, Russia).
 Tallinn–Keila–Paldiski, . Passenger trains are operated by Elron (Tallinn–Pääsküla, Tallinn–Keila, Tallinn–Paldiski and Tallinn–Klooga-rand routes).
 Keila–Turba, Estonia, . This line is part of the former Keila–Haapsalu line, that was completed in 1905. The Riisipere–Haapsalu section was abandoned in 2004, but rebuilt as far as Turba during 2019, as a first step towards eventually re-opening the line to Haapsalu (and possibly the port at Rohuküla ).   Passenger trains are operated by Elron (Tallinn–Riisipere route).
 Tapa–Tartu, . Completed in 1877. Passenger trains are operated by Elron (Tallinn–Tartu and Tartu–Jõgeva routes).
 Tartu–Valga, 82.5 km. Completed in 1887. International connection from Valga in Estonia to Valka in Latvia. Passenger trains between Tartu and Valga are operated by Elron. Passenger trains between Valga and Riga are operated by Latvian Railways.
 Tartu–Pechory, . Built between 1929 and 1931. International connection from Koidula railway station (Koidula) in Estonia to Pechory in Russia. Passenger trains are operated by Elron (Tartu–Koidula route).
 Valga–Pechory, . Part of Riga–Pskov railway, opened to regular traffic in 1889. International connection from Koidula railway station in Estonia to Pechory in Russia. The line is used only by freight trains.

Owned by Edelaraudtee Infrastruktuuri AS:
 Tallinn–Lelle–(Pärnu)–(Mõisaküla),  (formerly 190.0 km). There was an international connection from Mõisaküla to Latvia, but the stretch Pärnu–Mõisaküla was abandoned in 2008. The Lelle-Pärnu section was permanently closed for passenger operations on 9 December 2018 as it required a €17 million refurbishment. A rail service to Pärnu station will be resumed with the opening of the Rail Baltica line.
 Lelle–Viljandi, . This line connects Viljandi to the Tallinn–Pärnu line via Lelle.

Major industrial railways
Main use of the network is transporting oil shale from underground and open-cast mines to the Narva Power Plants. The company is a subsidiary of Eesti Põlevkivi, which itself is a subsidiary of Eesti Energia, owned by the state.
 Rakvere–Kunda, . Built in 1896, this line connects the industrial town of Kunda to the Tallinn–Tapa–Narva line. The line is owned by private company Kunda Trans.

Connections to adjacent countries
Daily passenger service connect Tallinn with Moscow (night train; travel time is 15 hours) through Saint Petersburg, operated by the Russian Railways.

As of summer 2016 three daily trains operated by Latvian Railways connect Riga (Latvia) to Valga (Estonia). The other railway lines to neighbouring countries are not used for direct passenger traffic at the moment. It is possible to travel between Tallinn and Riga with train change at Valga, and the timetables of Tallinn–Valga and Valga–Riga are adjusted for that purpose, but this still takes a long time compared to bus (travel time about 5 hours) or air.

Historic train routes are Tallinn–Moscow via Tartu–Pechory, and Riga–St. Petersburg, which passed through Estonia from Valka, Latvia to Valga, Estonia–Võru–Piusa–Pechory, Russia. Both were closed in the 1990s.

There are plans for a new high-speed line Tallinn–Riga (continuing to Poland), Rail Baltica, planned to be in operation around 2027.

Railway links with adjacent countries 
 Same gauge:
  Latvia – yes
 at Valga – diesel trains only
  Russia – yes
 at Narva – diesel trains only
 at Koidula – diesel trains only

Operators
Freight trains are operated by Eesti Raudtee and private companies including Estonian Railway Services (E.R.S. AS), and Spacecom.

Passenger services are offered by three operators:
 Elron, domestic routes
 Russian Railways, Tallinn–Saint Petersburg and Tallinn–Moscow
 Pasažieru vilciens, Valga–Riga

See also
 Narrow gauge railways in Estonia
 Rail Baltica
 Rail transport by country
 Transport in Estonia

References

External links

 Division of railways at Estonian Technical Surveillance Authority  — Web pages containing various statistical information about the railway network and operations in Estonia.
 Map of public railways and railway stations (link broken)
 National railway company Eesti Raudtee 
 Estonian Railway Museum in Haapsalu (history page)  
 Estonian private Railway Company "GoRail" official website 
Estonia: End of the line for Europe's passenger rail network